Goalball at the 1996 Summer Paralympics consisted of men's and women's team events.

Medal summary

Men's tournament

Group A

Group B

Second rounds

Final rounds

Women's tournament

Group A

Group B

Final rounds

Pictures

References 

 

1996 Summer Paralympics events
1996
Goalball in the United States